Patryk Wolski (born 12 April 1993) is a Polish former footballer who played as a forward. At the age of 22 he became the manager of amateur club Centrum Radom.

References

External links 
 

1993 births
Living people
Polish footballers
Association football forwards
Ekstraklasa players
II liga players
III liga players
Lech Poznań players
Lech Poznań II players
Radomiak Radom players
People from Radom
Sportspeople from Masovian Voivodeship